Battle of the Year, commonly referred to as BOTY, is an annual international breakdancing competition that began in 1990. It has been regarded as the premier b-boying competition in the world
 and has been referred to as the "World Cup of B-Boying". Regional qualifying tournaments, also known as preliminaries, are held worldwide culminating in the BOTY International, the world finals event which is currently held at Sud de France Arena in Montpellier, France.

For the first twenty-three editions, Battle of the Year was a crew competition; in 2013, a one-on-one competition was added. Since 2014, the one-on-one portion of Battle of the Year is one of ten tournaments that are a part of the World BBoy Series.

The competition spawned the 2007 documentary Planet B-Boy as well as a 2013 eponymously named feature film Battle of the Year, both directed by Benson Lee. It has also gained attention for positive promotion of hip-hop culture and social unity.

Past Battle of the Year results

In 2006, 2 semifinal battles were implemented, with the winner of each battle advancing to the finals. The losers of the semifinal battles do not battle each other; therefore, there is no longer a fourth-place award.

Until 2006, one battle was held solely for first place and one battle was held solely for third place.

Past Battle of the Year Solo Champions results

2016 season

2016 World Finals results

 
Best Show:  Melting Force

2016 International 1 on 1 Battle results

Bruce Almighty earned a bid to the Undisputed World BBoy Series in Prague at the end of the 2016 year by winning BOTY Solo.

2015 season

2015 World Finals results

 
Best Show:  Doble KO

2015 International 1 on 1 Battle results

Menno earned a bid to the Undisputed World BBoy Series at the end of the 2015 year by winning BOTY Solo.

2014 season

2014 World Finals results

 
Best Show:  Fusion MC

Crew List for 2014 World Finals

2014 International 1 on 1 Battle results

Alkolil earned a bid to the Undisputed World BBoy Series at the end of the 2014 year by winning BOTY Solo.

2013 season

2013 World Finals results
Like in 2012, Battle of the Year 2013 included an additional semifinals placer to add additional battles to the tournament. Six crews qualified after the showcase stage of the competition consisting of the two highest scoring crews automatically qualified for the semifinals and four crews competing for the two remaining places against them.

Best Show:  The Floorriorz

Crew List for 2013 World Finals

2013 International 1 on 1 Battle results

2012 season

2012 World Finals results
Battle of the Year 2012 included an additional semifinals placer to add additional battles to the tournament. In 2012 six crews qualified after the showcase stage of the competition consisting of the two highest scoring crews automatically qualified for the semifinals and four crews competing for the two remaining places against them.

Best Show:  Vagabond Crew

Crew List for 2012 World Finals

kamikaz crew Algeria

2011 season

2011 World Finals results

Best Show:   Vagabonds

Crew List for 2011 World Finals

2010 season

2010 World Finals results

Best Show:   Mortal Combat

Crew List for 2010 World Finals

2009 season
For the first time in the Competition's history, a 1 on 1 Tournament was held for b-boys who weren't competing as a part of a crew. The first 1 on 1 Battle of the Year final saw Lilou of Algeria defeat Morris representing the U.S..

2009 World Finals results

Best Show:  All Area

Crew List for 2009 World Finals

2008 season

2008 World Finals results

Best Show:  Top 9

Crew List for 2008 World Finals
This list is in chronological order by date qualified.

2007 season

2007 World Finals results

Best Show:  Turn Phrase Crew

Crew List for 2007 World Finals
This list is in chronological order by date qualified. Preliminaries that have not occurred yet have a colored background.

2006 season

2006 World Finals results

Best Show:  Vagabonds

Crew List for 2006 World Finals

Series Format

World Finals Format
The format comprises firstly a showcase round in which all crews perform a routine of no more than six minutes in length demonstrating their ability in the different styles of breakdance. Judges rank all competing crews by evaluating certain criteria based on the shows.

Following the showcase round, the top four crews are selected to take part in a crew-vs-crew battle playoff. In the semifinals, the top-ranked crew battles the 4th-ranked crew and the 2nd-ranked crew battles the 3rd-ranked crew. The winner of each semifinal then battle each other for the championship.

An award, "Best Show", is also given to the crew that had the best-scoring showcase.

Scoring Criteria
Judges evaluate the showcase round on two main elements, artistry and technicality, each of which includes several criteria. The artistry element includes theme, music, synchronicity, and choreography, among others. The technicality element includes toprock, uprock, footwork, and power moves, among others.

Qualification and Preliminaries
The champion of the world finals is always invited directly to the following year's world finals to defend their title. All other crews qualify via preliminary tournaments, although historically there have been a few instances of directly-invited crews (usually when there is no preliminary in that crew's region).

Qualification is moving towards a two-step system consisting of individual country preliminaries followed by regional preliminaries. Historically, each country had an individual preliminary and sent one crew to the world finals; however, countries have become more and more regionalized over the years. For example, starting in 2007, there is a new BOTY Asia regional preliminary that will send the top 3 finishers to the world finals; in 2006 and years prior, Asia region countries such as South Korea, Japan, China, and Taiwan had their own preliminaries and sent one crew each to the world finals.

The following is a chart showing the regions and countries in the region, as well as number of crews sent to the world finals, for the 2007 season.

* Winner of BOTY India will participate in BOTY Asia from 2011
* BOTY North East Europe regional preliminary was canceled. On July 10, 2007, it was announced that BOTY North East Europe member countries would be allowed to enter BOTY Scandinavia.
** On September 7, 2007, the BOTY USA 2007 qualifier was announced; however, it was canceled less than one month later.

World Finals Format History

Prior to 2006, the current championship playoff system was not used. Instead, there were only two battles: two crews would compete for first place, while two other crews would compete for third place. While a "Best Show" award was still granted based on showcase performance, the judges would also rank the crews as to who they thought should participate in the championship battle. This resulted in frequently-occurring situations where the crew that received the "Best Show" award was not even able to compete for the championship, as they were picked for the third place battle instead of the championship battle. Examples include three "Best Show" winners in the final five years under the old format: Break the Funk (2004), Fire Works (2003), and Visual Shock (2001). The change to the playoff system also brought the world finals format into line with some of the qualifier formats, such as the BOTY Korea Preliminary, which has been using the four-crew playoff system for years.

Starting in 2004, a strict 6-minute time limit per crew on the showcase was enforced for the world finals, with scoring penalties assessed for going over time. This was enacted so that the world finals event would finish in a shorter time period. The 6-minute limit was quickly adopted at preliminaries.

In 1990, when the event was known as the International Breakdance Cup, there were only shows and no battles. From 1991-1996, there were battles resulting in a crowned champion, but no "Best Show" award was given.

Media
An official DVD documenting the event is usually released a few months after the tournament. It is a perennial best seller on breaking and hip-hop media retail web sites.

Several documentaries have been produced based on the competition, including the 2007 feature-length documentary Planet B-Boy. The film premiered at the 2007 TriBeCa Film Festival and was released on DVD on November 11, 2008.

A movie based on this competition, called Battle of the Year, was released on September 20, 2013. The film was directed by Benson Lee, who produced Planet B-Boy, and featured famous artist Chris Brown in the primary role.

On occasion with the annual competition, a CD/LP titled "The Official Battle Of The Year Motion Soundtrack" is released since 1998. It features some of the leading B-Boy Funk artists such as Mr. Confuse, Cosmic EFI, DJ Nas'D, Esone, Def Cut, Cutmaster GB, and DJ Phantom. The cover artwork is drawn by Graffiti artist Mode 2.

References

External links
 Battle of the Year official website
 Battle of the Year TV special at MixeryRawDeluxe.TV

Breakdance
Street dance competitions
Culture in Braunschweig
World championships in dance